Jackson Wilcox (born August 16, 1989) is an American swimmer.

Career

At the 2009 US National Championships and World Championship Trials, Wilcox won the 1500 m freestyle with a time of 15:11.98, earning a place to compete at the 2009 World Aquatics Championships in Rome. Wilcox finished 14th in the 800 m freestyle (7:57.09) and 12th in the 1500 m freestyle (15:09.66) in Rome.

Personal bests (long course)

References

External links
 
 
 

1989 births
Living people
Texas Longhorns men's swimmers
People from Memphis, Tennessee
People from Nashville, Tennessee
American male freestyle swimmers